Aotearoa is the Māori name for New Zealand.

Aotearoa may also refer to:

Music 
 "Aotearoa" (anthem), Māori version of "God Defend New Zealand"
 Aotearoa (overture), a 1940 overture by Douglas Lilburn
 Aotearoa: Stand Strong, a 1991 compilation album by Festival Records
 "Aotearoa" (Jenny Morris song), a 1989 song by Jenny Morris
 "Aotearoa" (TrinityRoots song), a 2004 song by TrinityRoots
 "Aotearoa" (Minuit song), a 2009 song by Minuit
 "Aotearoa" (Stan Walker song), a 2014 song by Stan Walker
 Aotearoa Music Awards (formerly the New Zealand Music Awards), presented annually

People
 Aotearoa Mata'u (born 1997), New Zealand rugby union player

Vehicles 
 Aotearoa (canoe), a type of ocean-going, voyaging canoe used by the Māori
 Aotearoa (aircraft), an aircraft that disappeared in 1928 during the first attempted trans-Tasman flight
 Aotearoa (yacht), a catamaran that competed in the 2013 America's Cup
 HMNZS Aotearoa, an auxiliary ship of the New Zealand Navy launched in 2019

Other
 Aotearoa (meeting house), at Paparoa, New Zealand
 Aotearoa magna, a spider genus
 3400 Aotearoa, a minor planet

See also
 
 
 Aotea (disambiguation)